Rupertswood railway station was located on the Melbourne - Bendigo railway in the north-western Melbourne suburb of Sunbury in Victoria, Australia. It was the last station in the state that operated only to service school traffic, with services only stopping to pick up and drop off passengers for the adjacent Salesian College.

Rupertswood was first opened in 1879 as a private platform on the down line, for the convenience of guests at "Rupertswood", the country residence of William John Clarke, who became Australia's first baronet. His townhouse was "Cliveden", in Wellington Parade, Melbourne.

In addition to people attending garden parties at Rupertswood, the platform was used on approximately 15 occasions between July 1879 and February 1890, for various groups, such as Sunday school excursions. The Findon Harriers and the Sunbury Racing Club also used the platform for their fox hunts and race meetings.

In 1889, the Victorian Railways traffic manager recommended the construction of a second platform, because of the number of people who had to cross the tracks. For example, during a medical congress in January 1889, over 800 people had to do so. There was also the problem of having to work the system as a single line between Sunbury and the only platform. The cost of the second platform was debited to maintenance rather than Sir William Clarke.

In 1927, Rupertswood mansion was acquired by the Salesian Order who established a boys' boarding school there. From about 1930, an annual Eucharistic Festival was held at the school, with a number of special trains being run, requiring temporary intermediate block posts to be established between St Albans and Sunbury. The last Eucharistic Festival was held in 1980.

In 1940, the second platform was removed. After 1962, the station was used daily by students attending the college. In the early 2000s, the Victorian government's Regional Fast Rail project involved the rebuilding of much of the Bendigo line. Because Rupertswood station only catered for school traffic it was decided to close it, and that occurred in December 2004.

References

Disused railway stations in Victoria (Australia)
Railway stations in Australia opened in 1913
Railway stations closed in 2004
Sunbury, Victoria